The Boëme is a river in the southwest of France, a tributary of the Charente. The river begins in the Charente department in the Nouvelle-Aquitaine region. It is sometimes written as  Boême and Bohème.

Course 
The Boëme flows from south of Angoulême, to Chadurie, near the source of the Né, but diverges west and flows northerly. The river passes under the Des Coutaubières viaduct, through Mouthiers-sur-Boëme and La Couronne. It joins the Charente on the left bank near  Nersac, downstream from Angoulême. Many grain and paper mills lie along the Boëme, including the historic Moulin de la Courade.

It passes through the cantons of Blanzac-Porcheresse and La Couronne.

Management 
The water quality of the river is measured at the N699 bridge in Nersac. The long-term results for water chemistry show that the quality is average. More recent results, since 2011, were classed as good.

The river is managed by le Syndicat intercommunal d'aménagement hydraulique (SIAH) of Boëme, which in 2011 completed a series of improvements along the river to restore the river to a more natural state.

See also
 List of rivers of France

References 

Rivers of France
Rivers of Charente
Rivers of Nouvelle-Aquitaine